This is a list of notable people who are from New Brunswick, Canada, or have spent a large part or formative part of their career in that province.

By city or town 
Click on the "people from..." link below to go to the full page of notable people, or click "show" next to each page to view the table within this page.

By county 
Click on the "people from..." link below to go to the full page of notable people, or click "show" next to each page to view the table within this page.

References